Amor Prohibido is the fourth studio album by American singer Selena, released on March 13, 1994, by EMI Latin. Having reached a core fan base, the label aimed to broaden her appeal with the next
studio release. Finding it challenging to write a follow-up hit after "Como la Flor" (1992), Selena's brother A. B. Quintanilla enlisted the assistance from band members Ricky Vela and Pete Astudillo with writing the album's songs. The resulting album has a more mature sound featuring experimental production that blends diverse musical styles from ranchera to hip-hop music. Amor Prohibido is a Tejano cumbia album modernized with a synthesizer-rich delivery using a minimalist style that was quintessential in early 1990s Tejano music.

The album's songs deal with dysfunctional and volatile relationships; its lyrics explore unrequited love, infidelity, and social division. With relatively few love songs, Amor Prohibido narrates a woman's struggles and triumphs following unsuccessful relationships with men who struggle with commitment.  The album continued the singer's streak of number-one singles on the United States Billboard Hot Latin Songs chart with the title track "Amor Prohibido"— which became the most successful US Latin single of 1994, a feat she repeated the following year with "No Me Queda Más". Along with the latter, "Bidi Bidi Bom Bom" and "Fotos y Recuerdos" also topped the US Latin chart, and together with "Si Una Vez" are regarded as Selena's signature recordings.

When the album tour broke attendance records at the Houston Astrodome and attracted a record-breaking crowd at Miami's Calle Ocho Festival, Selena became recognized as one of the biggest US Latin touring acts at that time. Amor Prohibido became the first Tejano record to peak at number one on the Billboard Top Latin Albums chart, remaining in the top five for 98 consecutive weeks. The album holds the record for most weeks at number one on Billboards Regional Mexican Albums chart at 97 nonconsecutive weeks, as well as crowning the chart in four different calendar years. Amor Prohibido received critical acclaim, it is considered to be Selena's best work and her band's "crowning achievement". The album's sound received the highest acclaim, it was noted by critics to have retained its innovative spirit well into the 21st century. Amor Prohibido is credited with catapulting Tejano music into mainstream success resulting in sales to listeners previously unfamiliar with the genre. Amor Prohibido was nominated for Best Mexican-American Album at the 37th Grammy Awards. The record took Album of the Year honors at the 1995 TMA's and the Lo Nuestro Award for Best Regional Mexican Album.

On March 31, 1995, Selena was murdered by her friend and former manager of her Selena Etc. boutiques, Yolanda Saldívar. The record re-entered the Billboard 200 chart, peaking at number 29 and was certified gold by the Recording Industry Association of America (RIAA). Within three weeks, it was certified platinum and was re-certified by the RIAA as 36× platinum (Latin), denoting 2.14 million album-equivalent units sold. Amor Prohibido is the second-highest certified Latin album in the United States trailing only her posthumous album Dreaming of You (1995), the fourth best-selling Latin album in the US, the best-selling Tejano recording of the 1990s, and remains the best-selling Tejano recording of all time. Amor Prohibido has been ranked among the most essential Latin recordings of the past 50 years by Billboard magazine, while Rolling Stone magazine named it one of The 500 Greatest Albums of All Time. NPR ranked the album number 19 on their list of the 150 greatest albums made by women; it was the highest-ranking album by a female Latin artist and ninth highest-ranking recording by a woman of color.

Production and development

Background 
Following the release of Selena's third studio album Entre a Mi Mundo and the launch of a clothing boutique in 1993, the singer and her band began working on Amor Prohibido. Having achieved the success and fan base that EMI Latin's president Jose Behar was seeking, Behar aimed to capitalize on Selena's broad appeal with the next studio release. The label was keen to use a Grammy Award-winning producer instead of the singer's brother, A.B. Quintanilla. A.B. knew Selena's musical tastes and vocal range, though he found that he needed to outdo himself to remain her principal record producer. He found it challenging to meet expectations after the commercial success of Entre a Mi Mundo and its career-launching single "Como la Flor". When A.B. met with record executives in New York City and Nashville, they pressured him to come up with another successful song. He felt it was important that the music he produced for Selena remain fresh. He stressed that writing a successful song following "Como la Flor" was infeasible—as he expressed to Billboard, "you don't try to outdo a hit, you just write another hit". As with previous albums, A.B. enlisted Selena y Los Dinos band members, Pete Astudillo and Ricky Vela, to help with the writing process. The result included a mature sound for Selena with experimental recording and production than her previous works. It was the final album featuring production and songwriting by Astudillo, who subsequently parted with Los Dinos to pursue a solo career.

Recording 

Amor Prohibido was recorded at Manny Guerra's studio in San Antonio, Texas, and was engineered by Brian "Red" Moore. The production of Amor Prohibido lasted six months beginning on September 17, 1993. The recording schedule was squeezed in around touring commitments and the opening of Selena's boutiques, as Selena's husband and guitarist Chris Pérez recalled: "I don't even know how we managed to find time to make the next album." According to Vela, progress stalled and the band had to rush to finish production because of an approaching deadline. It then took two weeks to complete post-production. Vela said that it was common for the band to rehearse all of the music in advance of the recording sessions, as the band's production sequence remained unchanged for Amor Prohibido. Selena and the band recorded their parts in the studio after they had first perfected them during pre-production. A.B. would then arrange and mix them, using an AKAI MPC60 II for timing and tempo control before studio mixing instruments were used. It took two weeks for Selena to record the album's ten tracks.

Pérez provided an evocative account of working with Selena during the sessions for Amor Prohibido. Pérez wrote how Selena never complained in the studio, adding that the singer was never recalcitrant towards changes. Selena would often arrive at the studio during the album's production, "hum her part a little", and then proceeded to the mall informing the band not to worry because she would "know what to do when [the band is] ready to record." Nevertheless, Pérez explained that the band never had to approach Selena on changes in the studio as she disciplined herself and tracked her vocals while requesting a second take in order to "add little harmonies she'd create" during recording. A.B. described his own creative process during the sessions in a 1994 interview with KMOL. He would use a tape recorder to hum a melody before creating a title and concept of a song. If he caught himself humming a tune the next day "then it's catchy", and otherwise he "wouldn't use it." A.B. also requested material from Rena Dearman, former keyboardist of the group, who provided several songs. A.B. favored "I'll Be Alright" and wanted Selena to record the song for Amor Prohibido. After it was rejected by EMI Latin because it was incoherent of the album's theme, A.B. suggested that it could be included in Selena's next Tejano recording.
 

One song–"Bidi Bidi Bom Bom"–was improvised during a rehearsal starting off as a song with few, if any, lyrics. The band's drummer, Selena's sister Suzette Quintanilla, said "we were goofing off" and insisted that after A.B. began playing a groove on his guitar, Selena started singing, coming up with lyrics "as ideas came to her." It started off with lyrics about a cheerful fish swimming freely in the ocean, which Astudillo likened to a nursery rhyme, organized around a wah-wah guitar riff using a crybaby that was improvised by Pérez. The track, then called "Itty Bitty Bubbles", became an extended jam during the band's concerts to prevent promoters from reducing their pay for playing for a shorter time than promised. Selena performed the song at the La Feria concert in Nuevo Leon in September 1993, a day before the singer and Astudillo began "[putting] the lyrics and melody together". A.B. saw potential in the tune and "nipped and tucked what Selena [had already done]". He joined as co-writer, writing the guitar solos for Pérez, as well as the arrangements for the song. A.B. called it "kinda a little scary" finding the project the first of its kind. The day before the band was scheduled to record the album, A.B. approached Pérez and asked if he would be interested in working with Vela on "Ya No", a song that A.B. had written. Pérez worked with Vela throughout the night improvising the drum sounds and programming the music for it, adding electric guitar riffs, and complementing it with his own musical style. Pérez was dumbfounded that despite A.B.'s assistance he had been given creative control over the track.

The idea for the album's title track was Selena's own, although Astudillo had at one time aspired to write a telenovela-esque song entitled "Amor Prohibido". Together with A.B. and Astudillo, Selena began writing and recording a track based on a story about her great-grandparents. The singer was inspired by love letters written by her great-grandmother who wrote about her experiences as a maid to the Calderon family, a wealthy family who lived in Nueva Rosita, Mexico who immigrated from Spain, and her infatuation with their son. Her great-grandmother was forbidden to form a relationship with him because of her social class and described it as "forbidden love". Astudillo feared that Selena's father would reject the song because of the lyrical content of disobeying one's parents to pursue true love, as Selena herself had done when eloping with Pérez in 1992. Abraham heard "Amor Prohibido" after Selena recorded the track and enjoyed it, he found the lyrics to be relatable something "many families have gone through". While recording the song, Selena had ad-libbed "oh whoa, baby". Her brother believed that the recording would not have been the same had she not added the "oh whoa, baby" part. "Amor Prohibido" sampled the cencerro, which was intended by A.B., to attract people of different ethnicities to Selena's music. The media attention following Selena's death led the Calderon family to Selena and the song "Amor Prohibido", they visited the family for the first time and traveled to Corpus Christi. After falling in love with Suzette, and finding out about her marriage in September 1993, Vela wrote down how he felt; which he had kept private from her. The resulting song was titled "No Me Queda Más" and it was given to Selena to record for the album. According to Abraham, Selena provided an emotional delivery while recording the track and was seen sobbing in the recording studio because "she knew how [Vela] felt" about Suzette.

During recording sessions for "Techno Cumbia", A.B. encouraged Selena to rap with a New York accent similar to Rosie Perez. During a New York trip, A.B. heard the Pretenders' 1983 single "Back on the Chain Gang" on the radio. Concerned about the lack of material the band had to record for the album, and captivated by the idea of reworking "Back on the Chain Gang" into a Spanish-language cumbia song, A.B. asked Vela to write a translation of the lyrics. After discovering that Selena had sampled her song, Pretenders' vocalist Chrissie Hynde prevented the band from releasing Amor Prohibido and demanded a translation from Vela before she approved a rights agreement. At the time of Hynde's refusal, the band had $475,000 (1994 USD) of pre-sale copies in a warehouse that included "Fotos y Recuerdos". Perone complemented A.B.'s arrangement as "an example of [his] universal Latin approach."

Composition 

Amor Prohibido contains a more diverse collection of musical styles than Selena's previous work, ranging from ranchera to hip-hop music. Music critics believe it is an album of various genres accessible to both traditional and contemporary Latin music fans. Jeff Young, then-EMI Latin's sales director, labeled Amor Prohibido as "Pop International", which Mark Schone of Newsday believed was a ploy by the company to broaden Selena's appeal. Musicologist Matt Doeden found the album as having "a new sound" whose aim was to appeal to a broad audience. Perone found the mixture of compositions on the album to be rock and dance music, and according to Frank Hoffman in the Encyclopedia of Recorded Sound, the album exhibited the band's broad range of styles. Newsweek found the music in Amor Prohibido to have combined house music, cumbia, rock, dancehall, and new wave that was modernized in a kaleidoscopic form that embodied postmodern maelstrom of the mid-'90s. Amor Prohibido diverged from Selena's "stock-in-trade contemporary Tex-Mex sound." Mario Tarradell of The Dallas Morning News, however, believed the title track and "Bidi Bidi Bom Bom" contained Selena's cheerful and enthusiastic personality that were prevalent in previous recordings. The album's musical influences include salsa, funk, R&B, bubblegum pop, teen pop, pop ballads, techno, a fusion of reggae and dancehall, rock, polka, conjunto, flamenco, mariachi, corridos, and Tejano cumbia. Tejano cumbia is used heavily throughout Amor Prohibido. Author Ed Morales noticed its representation of the "cumbia sound" already established by Tejano band La Mafia, though Donald Clarke found Selena's delivery to be more of a modernized synthesizer-rich sound. While Amor Prohibido is a cross-cultural musical fusion, it remains an authentic Tejano recording, which uses a minimalist style that was quintessential in early 1990s Tejano music.

Selena called the recordings on Amor Prohibido as "love songs [or songs about] getting your heartbroken". Lyrically, the title track "Amor Prohibido" encapsulates the social divide between a poverty-stricken woman and the man of unreachable rank with whom she has fallen in love. The lyrics have been analyzed by authors, musicologists, and critics, who found them relevant to issues facing the LGBT community. They are ambiguous, and have been interpreted to portray prohibited romance between same-sex couples, modern society's views of romantic relationships, and to Romeo & Juliet. A review in The Monitor felt that the lyrics portrayed the forbidden love that Selena and Pérez hid from her overbearing father. Musically, the titular song is "an emotional uptempo ballad" which showcases the singer's "passionate side". In "Cobarde", the protagonist calls her partner a "coward" upon learning on his inability to face her after feeling reticent about his affair. Two other tracks, "Ya No" and "Si Una Vez", delve into heartaches of failed relationships with the protagonist in the former song angrily refusing to take back a cheating partner. Selena's vocals were called "strong [and] raspy" in "Si Una Vez". Suzette particularly liked because Selena gave "that attitude" in the song.

"Tus Desprecios" has a storyline typical of mariachi recordings, concerning dysfunctional and volatile relationships. The track uses the traditional Tejano conjunto (small band) style and includes a trilling accordion motif. On the day Selena recorded the song, she was suffering from a bronchitis episode. Perone wrote that the song showed Selena's ease with pop, Latin, and Tejano styles. Writing for The Miami Herald, Mario Tarradell described "Tus Desprecios" and "Si Una Vez" as having a more traditional Tejano sound than the rest of the tracks on Amor Prohibido but found them riddled with synthesizers and digital processing. Another track, "No Me Queda Más", uses the identical style of ranchera songs, with the female singer agonizing over the end of a relationship. The lyrics explore an unrequited love in which a woman wishes the best for her former lover despite her own agony. Jose Feliciano express his take on the song, noting a sense of sorrowfulness in the lyrics, while finding cognitive parallels to Selena's life, and noticed a comparison of compositions that are typically recorded by Pedro Infante. Selena's voice was admired for being powerful and emotive, while her vocals were found to have been subdued and solemn and were sung in a desperate and emotional way. Hispanic magazine praised Selena's vocal interpretations in "No Me Queda Más", citing the singer's ability to tackle such a song reserved for established musicians twice her age.

Joe Nick Patoski of The New York Times, recognized the melody of "Fotos y Recuerdos" from the Pretenders' new wave sound, that played on a rock en español groove surrounded with organs and percussions which "transcend[ed] traditional Tejano sounds." He also noticed that Pérez's lead guitar emulated the style of the Pretenders' James Honeyman-Scott. Newsweek praised Pérez' guitar solos and the lyrics on "Fotos y Recuerdos" which explored forbidden romance, with the singer "cherishing memories of a relationship". John LaFollette of The Monitor called Selena's simultaneous appeals to multiculturalism and commerce in the song "as American as apple pie." The track supplements rock and house rhythms with synth-driven strings and layers of percussion, including steel drums under a cumbia beat. Perone located suggestions of Jamaica, Cuba, and Trinidad and Tobago. "Techno Cumbia" featured Selena rapping under a cumbia beat supplemented with congas, hi-hats, techno samples, and EBM. Patoski acclaimed the band's new take on the cumbia rhythm, updated vocal samples, drums inspired from New Orleans, and horn charts taken from soca from the Caribbean. "Techno Cumbia" was praised as the first successful case of a cumbia-rap prototype in the industry. "Bidi Bidi Bom Bom", which also draws on music from the Caribbean, features lusher arrangements and less driven, trebly synthesizers than the first four songs on Amor Prohibido. Infused with cumbia and reggae, its onomatopoeic title and its nonsensical lyrics suggests the sound of Selena's heart palpitating whenever she thought of her husband. Critics praised the song's catchiness and noted a sense of conviviality in the track. "Bidi Bidi Bom Bom" is musically similar to "El Chico del Apartamento 512"; Perone noted a recurring theme of attraction to a young man. The latter song's hook is more accessible to listeners with limited Spanish than that of "Bidi Bidi Bom Bom". In "El Chico del Apartamento 512", called a "sunny pop anthem", the protagonist is hit on by several men whom she has no interest in, except for the song's "boy in apartment 512". She finds enough courage to knock on his door to find it answered by a woman who asks if she is searching for her brother. To Perone, the song's lightness represents a relief from the heartbreak and despair elsewhere on the album.

Release and promotion 
Amor Prohibido was released in the United States on March 13, 1994. The release followed a recording contract with EMI Latin's pop division SBK Records, who aimed Selena to crossover into mainstream American pop music, in November 1993. After this news reached Billboard magazine, Amor Prohibido was given a spotlight feature in its album reviews which called its release a continuation of her "torrid streak." While Mark Holston of Hispanic magazine, wrote that the album's release reinforced her reputation as one of the leading Hispanic singers of the 1990s. With EMI Latin's president Jose Behar requesting enhancements to their commercial appeal, the band gave Argentine arranger Bebu Silvetti the song "No Me Queda Más" to be reworked into a pop-style track for its single release in October 1994. Amor Prohibido was subsequently re-released with a red sticker indicating that it included a "new version" of the song. In a Billboard interview, Behar said that "No Me Queda Más" was "internalized" without affecting the originality of its recording. During the twenty-year celebration of Selena releasing music, Amor Prohibido was repackaged and was made available for physical and digital purchase on September 22, 2002. The limited edition version included Selena's duet with the Barrio Boyzz on their 1994 single "Donde Quiera Que Estés", music videos for "Amor Prohibido" and "No Me Queda Más", as well as spoken liner notes containing commentary and recollections of each track provided by the singer's family, friends, and her band.

After featuring on "Donde Quiera Que Estés", Selena went on a mini-tour with the Barrio Boyzz that enabled her to visit New York City, Argentina, Puerto Rico, the Dominican Republic, and Central America, where she was not well known. In September 1994, Selena sold out the 10,000 seats D.C. Armory in Washington, DC, with mostly Central Americans in attendance. Daniel Bueno, who organized the event, told The Washington Post that Central Americans loathe Tejano music and thought that the addition of reggae and tropical music into her repertoire had helped her appeal to Central Americans. Nelly Carrion, a journalist for the Washington Hispanic, expressed how the audience resonated emotionally towards Selena's performance and stressed how people were desperate to touch Selena, forcing her act to be suspended. Selena made several appearances on television and in live shows to promote Amor Prohibido. Most notably, her performance at the Houston Astrodome on February 26, 1995, has been called one of her best. The event was critically praised for breaking attendance records set by country music musicians Vince Gill, Reba McEntire, and George Strait. Her performance in the Astrodome was emulated by Jennifer Lopez in her role as the singer in the 1997 biopic. The singer appeared at the Calle Ocho Festival in Miami, with an estimated 100,000 in attendance breaking previous audience records. Her performance on a November 1994 episode of Sabado Gigante was ranked among the most memorable moments in the show's 53-year history. Selena performed "Bidi Bidi Bom Bom", "No Me Queda Más", "El Chico del Apartamento 512", and "Si Una Vez" on the Johnny Canales Show, which was later released as part of the host's "favorite songs" on DVD. Selena's performance of "Bidi Bidi Bom Bom" on July 31, 1994, at Six Flags AstroWorld was the subject of a video released by the Houston Chronicle for their segment "On This Forgotten Day". Ramiro Burr, of Billboard, called the singer's tour for her album a "tour de force". The concerts established Selena as one of Latin music's most successful contemporary acts.

Singles 
Tracks released from the album continued the singer's streak of US number-one singles. The title track, "Amor Prohibido", was the album's lead single released on April 13, 1994. The song peaked at number one on the Billboard Hot Latin Songs chart the week ending June 11 – her first number one as a solo artist – and remained atop the chart for nine consecutive weeks becoming the most successful US Latin single of 1994. "Amor Prohibido" was certified 7× platinum by the Recording Industry Association of America (RIAA) denoting sales of 420,000 digital units. "Bidi Bidi Bom Bom" followed in July, reaching the top of the chart in its eleventh week on October 29, it remained at number one for four consecutive weeks, and was certified 9× platinum by the RIAA for sales of 540,000 digital copies. "No Me Queda Más" was released in November peaking at number one for seven nonconsecutive weeks. The single fared better in 1995, remaining entrenched in the top ten on the Hot Latin Songs chart for twelve consecutive weeks, earning it the title of Billboard most successful US Latin single that year. The track was certified quadruple platinum by the RIAA for digital sales of 240,000 units. The album's final single "Fotos y Recuerdos", released in January 1995, peaked at number one following the shooting death of Selena on March 31, 1995. At the time of her death, the song was at number four. "Fotos y Recuerdos" peaked and remained atop the Hot Latin Songs chart for seven weeks, finishing the year as the second most played track in the US trailing "No Me Queda Más". The song was certified platinum by the RIAA for digital sales of 60,000 copies. Although not released as singles from Amor Prohibido, "Techno Cumbia" was certified platinum by the RIAA for sales of 60,000 digital units, "El Chico del Apartamento 512" was certified double platinum for selling 120,000 copies, while "Si Una Vez" received a triple-platinum certification for 180,000 copies sold.

Mario Tarradell of The Dallas Morning News wrote that the singles from Amor Prohibido elevated Selena to success on Latin radio whose promoters had not previously taken the singer seriously. "Bidi Bidi Bom Bom" was ranked number 54 on the Dallas Observers list of the Best Texas Songs of All-time. The song was listed as an honorable mention on Billboards top ten list of best Tejano songs of all-time, while "No Me Queda Más" ranked ninth. Lisa Leal of KVTV said that "No Me Queda Más" and "Bidi Bidi Bom Bom", continue to be popular with fans and are Spanish-language counterparts of the Beatles' 1965 single, "Yesterday", in fan popularity. Author Kristine Burns also considered that the two aforementioned singles aided the growth of Selena's fan base. "Bidi Bidi Bom Bom" was the most-played song from Amor Prohibido on Mexican radio, and remains a Latin pop and American pop standard. "Fotos y Recuerdos" has been recognized as the singer's "best-known dance tracks", while "Amor Prohibido" was popular on radios across Spanish-speaking countries. "Techno Cumbia", considered a stable in the 1990s for family gatherings in South Texas, is believed by musicologists to have spearheaded a new style of music. Following the 16th anniversary of the album's release, a readers poll in The Monitor saw participants choosing "No Me Queda Más" and "Fotos y Recuerdos" as their top picks, saying they "loved the feeling and musicianship in those two songs." Three tracks on Amor Prohibido ranked among Billboards Greatest Hot Latin Songs of All-Time list in 2016, including "No Me Queda Más" at number 13, "Fotos y Recuerdos" at number 29, and "Amor Prohibido" at number 46. The majority of the recordings found on Amor Prohibido have been named Selena's signature songs including the title track, "Bidi Bidi Bom Bom", "Fotos y Recuerdos", and "Si Una Vez".

Critical reception

Reviews 

The vast majority of contemporary reviews were positive. Critics at The New York Times overwhelmingly praised the album: Peter Watrous felt it stayed honest to her "country, working-class constituency" and Greg Kot praised its "contemporary snap", while Joe Nick Patoski hailed Amor Prohibido as a "watershed" recording from a supergroup at the top of its game. Others, such as AllMusic's Stephen Thomas Erlewine, musicologist James Perone, and music editor Mario Tarradell panned the album initially before coming to view Amor Prohibido positively. Tarradell called Selena "Miss Mexican Lite" and criticized the lack of songs true to regional Mexican music, before calling the album "delightfully infectious". Perone felt the album sounded dated, despite providing ample evidence of the singer's appeal, whereas Erlewine characterized Amor Prohibido as "slightly uneven" and praised Selena's success at recording the weaker material. Erlewine would later describe Amor Prohibido as Selena's strongest album, and an effective introduction to her work that highlighted her successful interpretation of the Tejano sound.

The album's sound received positive reviews. Described by author Ed Morales as a "subtle evolution", and by The Dallas Morning News as "delightfully infectious, hummable [and] ultra radio-friendly", the tracks were summarized and praised by The Monitor as "romantic, charming and ebullient." Billboard characterized the album's sound to be transparent for those unfamiliar with its musical diversity, while the Houston Chronicle marveled Amor Prohibidos ability at retaining its innovative sound well into the 21st century; a sound which was "light years ahead" of the singer's contemporaries. The singer's "seductive alto" was described as at a peak of expression. The San Antonio Express-News collectively praised the band as being at their "creative peak", while A.B.'s production was highlighted by the Rolling Stone who labeled it the "Selena sound" that would have made the singer a dominant force on the music charts had it not been for her death. Amor Prohibido hinted of a "pop potential", an opinion echoed by author Matt Doeden, who felt that the recording exhibited Selena's potential to become the genre's first pop musician.

Many critics found Amor Prohibido to have been Selena's best work, calling it her band's "crowning achievement." Other reviews called the work the singer's "blockbuster album", her signature album, a "career-defining" release, her "most interesting" and "sleekest" record, a "desert island album" for fans, calling it a "notch up" in her career, a "landmark", a "victory" recording, a "sultry, regional anthem." and an "overnight sensation".

Recognition 
At the time of its release, Amor Prohibido was regarded as very popular in Hispanic communities, albeit one that exemplified a generational split within the Tejano market at the time. Musicians found contemporary Tejano more sophisticated and noticed that it was unnecessary to explore their roots to have successful recordings. A.B.'s musical production of fusing and blending urban musical compositions in Amor Prohibido, revolutionized Tejano music.  With Amor Prohibido, Selena brought Tejano music to unprecedented levels of mainstream success. The album was considered one of the first Latin recordings that were enjoyed in the United States during the 1990s Latin explosion, a period known as the golden age of Latin music which was fueled by the singer's death in 1995. Amor Prohibido popularized Tejano music among a younger and wider audience than at any other time in the genre's history. The album was instrumental in popularizing Tejano music and has been credited for "[putting] Tejano music on the map." Amor Prohibido was called the first record many young Hispanic females bought "with lyrics in the language [their] blood is rooted in." With Amor Prohibido, Selena provided a voice and exhibited the experiences of Latinos in the United States. At the time of its release, the album was aimed to surpass limitations in the music industry, ultimately becoming "an ageless cultural symbol".

After the album's release, Selena was considered "bigger than Tejano itself", and was credited for tearing down barriers in the Latin music market. Amor Prohibido established Selena as a figure in American pop music. Critics felt the recording elevated Selena among the leading females in the Latin music sector and established her as a leading performer among young singers with mainstream appeal. Mario Tarradell of The Dallas Morning News believed Selena had "conquered the Latin pop landscape", while Herón Márquez called it a "landmark success". In a November 1994 Billboard issue, Amor Prohibido was named, among other Latin recordings, as an example to show that American Latinos were able to sell albums in English-speaking markets across the US that had historically overlooked Latin music. According to Gisela Orozco of the Chicago Tribune, Selena became the most successful Tejano musician following the album's release. Amor Prohibido was played in its entirety at the 25th anniversary of the D.C. Latino Festival in July 1995, which followed her death in March of that year.
 
The album appeared on Tom Moon's list of the 1,000 Recordings to Hear Before You Die: A Listener's Life List (2008). The Seattle Post-Intelligencer included Amor Prohibido on its list of the best-produced albums of 1994, while the Houston Press placed it on its list of the best Texas albums of the past 30 years. Amor Prohibido was ranked ninth out of ten on Latin music critic Mario Tarradell's list of the best Latin music albums of the 1990s. BuzzFeed ranked Amor Prohibido number 22 on its list of the "35 Old-School Latino Albums You Probably Forgot About". Billboard magazine ranked Amor Prohibido among the most essential Latin recordings of the past 50 years, and included it on its list of the top 100 albums of all-time. In 2017, NPR ranked Amor Prohibido at number 19 on their list of the 150 greatest albums made by women, the highest-ranking album by a female Latin artist, and ninth highest-ranking recording by a woman of color. Music and media outlets, BuzzFeed, Billboard, and Apple Music, commemorated the album's 25th anniversary in March 2019. Other media outlets, such as Entertainment Tonight and the Houston Chrionicle, interviewed Jennifer Lopez, Ally Brooke, Cierra Ramirez, Natti Natasha, Anitta, Farina, Angela Aguilar, Becky G, and Kam Franklin on their take of Amor Prohibido and the singer's impact on their careers. In an interview with Billboard, Mexican singer Danna Paola spoke about how Amor Prohibido was the first album she ever bought. American soul singer Kam Franklin called the record as "one of the greatest albums of all time". In the updated edition of Rolling Stone magazine's The 500 Greatest Albums of All Time, the album ranked at number 479.

Accolades 
Selena dominated the 1995 Tejano Music Awards, winning every category in which she was eligible. Amor Prohibido won the Tejano Music Award for Album of the Year – Orchestra, while the title track won Record of the Year and Single of the Year. "Bidi Bidi Bom Bom" was Song of the Year, while "Techno Cumbia" received the award for Best Crossover Song. Amor Prohibido received a nomination for Best Mexican-American Album at the 37th Annual Grammy Awards. Music critic Chuck Philips, believed Selena was "the politically correct candidate" to win the Grammy, "with all the heavy media coverage she [had] received in the last two years [1992-94]". At the Premio Lo Nuestro 1995, the album won Best Regional Mexican Album and its titular single won Regional Mexican Song of the Year. At the second annual Billboard Latin Music Awards in 1995, it won Regional Mexican Album of the Year, Female and its namesake song won Regional Mexican Song of the Year while "No Me Queda Más" received the award for Music Video of the Year. Amor Prohibido was nominated for Album of the Year at the 1995 Desi Entertainment Awards, while the title track was nominated for Spanish-language Song of the Year. At the 1995 Pura Vida Hispanic Music Awards, music industry professionals voted for that year's Best Album for which they awarded to Amor Prohibido along with "Bidi Bidi Bom Bom" which took Music Video of the Year and Song of the Year honors.

Commercial performance

Chart history 
Amor Prohibido debuted at number three on the US Billboard Top Latin Albums chart the week ending April 9, 1994. The following week it rose to number two and received the greatest jump in sales for that week. In an interview with Billboard, A.B. was frustrated that the album had yet reached number one. He explained that they were limited in their capabilities with Tejano music and spoke about his excitement when Amor Prohibido finally topped the chart, saying the event "was a big thing [for us]." Amor Prohibido peaked at number one in its tenth week, becoming the second album to place first on the newly formed Top Latin Albums chart displacing Cuban singer Gloria Estefan's Mi Tierra from the top spot. Sales were so vigorous it nearly entered the US Billboard 200 and became the first Tejano record to peak at number one on the Top Latin Albums chart. The event marked Selena as the "hottest artist in the Latino market." The following week, the album entered the Billboard 200 chart at number 183, becoming the first record by a non-crossover act to do so since Mexican singer Luis Miguel's album Aries (1993). The album also became the first recording by a Tejano singer to chart on the Billboard 200. Mario Tarradell of The Dallas Morning News called the event "groundbreaking" and named Amor Prohibido as one of the most popular Latin recordings of 1994. Amor Prohibido and Mi Tierra switched back and forth between the first and second positions on the Top Latin Albums chart for five consecutive weeks.

On July 16, the album debuted at number 18 on the US Billboard Heatseekers Albums chart and ranked number one in the South Central United States region. By May 1994, Amor Prohibido had outsold other competing Tejano albums and lead the list of best-selling Tejano records of 1994. Amor Prohibido became the singer's third consecutive album to outsell men in the Tejano market who historically were unchallenged by women. By June 1994, Amor Prohibido outsold ZZ Top and Willie Nelson's recent releases in the state of Texas. Within 19 weeks of its release, the album outsold her previous recordings. It was selling 2,000 units a week in Mexico, while Selena was growing a following in Canada following the release of Amor Prohibido. By November 1994 a report by Billboard showed the singer was one of the top-selling acts in Mexico. Amor Prohibido finished 1994 as the fourth best-selling US Latin album and the best-selling regional Mexican album. After 48 weeks at number one on the US Billboard Regional Mexican Albums chart, Amor Prohibido was displaced by Bronco's Rompiendo Barreras. The recording became the second Tejano album to reach year-end sales of 500,000 copies, a feat that previously had only been accomplished by La Mafia. Despite this, Nielsen Soundscan reported that the recording actually sold 184,000 units by April 1995. According to Behar, sales figures Nielsen Soundscan provides do not include sales in small shops specializing in Latin music. Before Selena was murdered in March 1995, the album remained in the top five on the Top Latin Albums chart for 53 consecutive weeks. Album sales in the four weeks preceding her death were slightly above 2,000 units a week. In the week immediately before her death, Amor Prohibido sold 1,700 units. In Mexico, Amor Prohibido sold 400,000 units by April 1995, and subsequently received a gold certification.

Posthumous commercial performance 
Media attention had helped increased sales of Amor Prohibido as well as her back catalogue. As a result, EMI Latin increased the production of the singer's albums at their Los Angeles, California, and Greensboro, North Carolina plants. In the hours immediately after her death, it was the most requested album by people in music stores looking for her work. An Austin, Texas music retailer expressed how Amor Prohibido sold more units in the first month following her death "than it did the entire year it was out." This was echoed by a music wholesaler in Manhattan, who constantly sold out of Selena's albums the same day they received them, telling the local newspaper that "It used to be just the Mexicans [in Manhattan]. Now everybody likes her." In McAllen, Texas, music shops reported that people bought the singer's earlier works than Amor Prohibido, citing that "most fans already have her latest [album]". Music stores in Washington, DC, reportedly sold out of Amor Prohibido within days of her murder. The album reached number one for the fifth time on April 15, 1995, with sales of 12,040 units - a 580% increase over the previous week. The record subsequently re-entered the Billboard 200 chart at number 92 and at number one on the Regional Mexican Albums chart.  The album sold an additional 28,238 units (a 136% increase) and rose to number 36 on the Billboard 200 chart. Amor Prohibido peaked at number 29 during its fifth week on the Billboard 200. The event was "a rare feat" for a non-English album in the United States. The album jumped from number 20 to number six on the list of the best-selling albums in Southern California in the week following her death. The recording eventually ranked second on their list of the best-selling albums in the state. In a June 1995 report, Amor Prohibido was the second best-selling record in Puerto Rico. Amor Prohibido and her 1992 studio album Entre a Mi Mundo, rose 1,250% in sales in the eight weeks following her murder. The album helped increase local record shops in Texas who were "selling more than when [Selena] was alive". Amor Prohibido remained at number one on the Top Latin Albums chart for 16 weeks following her death until the release of her crossover album Dreaming of You replaced it on August 5. The album remained behind Dreaming of You for seven weeks. By the end of 1995, Amor Prohibido ranked second to Dreaming of You for the best-selling Latin album for that year, and remained the best-selling regional Mexican recording for three consecutive years.

After 98 weeks the album dropped from the top five on the Top Latin Albums chart, though it remained within the top ten for 12 additional weeks. Amor Prohibido holds the record for most weeks at number one on the Regional Mexican Albums chart at 97 weeks, and is the only album to reach number one in four different calendar years. Amor Prohibido became the ninth best-selling Latin album of 1996, and ranked as the second best-selling Latin catalog album of 1997, while in 1998 it placed third.  Billboards revised catalog criteria made it ineligible for the Top Latin Albums and Regional Mexican Albums chart on January 18, 1997. The album was removed from the list and began charting on the newly formed Latin Catalog Albums chart positioned at number two. Since 1997, the album has spent 13 nonconsecutive weeks at number one on the Top Latin Catalog Albums chart including three weeks in 2010.  Following another revision to its Latin albums charts, Billboard removed its two-decade-long ban of catalog albums in its chart beginning with the February 11, 2017 list; Amor Prohibido re-entered the Top Latin Albums and Regional Mexican Albums chart after 20 years. Still popular today, Nielsen SoundScan reported that Amor Prohibido was the ninth best-selling Latin record of 2016. After its revision, Amor Prohibido reclaimed the number one position on the Regional Mexican Albums chart in May 2017. Amor Prohibido was the first album by a woman to claim the top position since Jenni Rivera's Paloma Negra Desde Monterrey (2016). Amor Prohibido became the last album by a woman to claim the top spot until Rivera's daughter Chiquis Rivera debuted atop the chart in March 2018. As of 2018, the album has spent twenty weeks atop the Top Latin Albums chart, which is the ninth most weeks an album has spent at number one. Amor Prohibido has spent 111 weeks within the top ten of the Top Latin Albums chart, which is the second most weeks behind American singer Romeo Santos' Formula, Vol. 2 (2014).

In May 1995, the Recording Industry Association of America (RIAA) certified the album gold, for shipments of 500,000 units. Within three weeks, it was certified platinum for increments of one million units. Amor Prohibido became the first Tejano record to receive a platinum certification. The Sydney Morning Herald called the event "an achievement" for a Spanish-language album which was not "the music industry's language of choice." By June 1995, it had sold 1.5 million units in the US, of which 100,000 were sold in Puerto Rico alone. In March 2011, the RIAA updated its certification of Amor Prohibido as double Diamond during an unveiling of the United States Postal Service's forever stamps honoring Selena and several other Hispanic/Latino Americans. , the album has been certified 36× platinum (Latin), denoting 2.14 million album-equivalent units sold. Amor Prohibido is the second-highest certified Latin album in the United States trailing only her posthumous album Dreaming of You (1995). Amor Prohibido is the fourth best-selling Latin album of all-time in the US with over 1.246 million copies sold . The album has sold over 2.5 million copies worldwide. The recording has been ranked as the best-selling Tejano album of the 1990s, and the best-selling Tejano album of all-time.

Track listing 
Credits adapted from the liner notes of Amor Prohibido.

Credits and personnel 
Credits adapted from the liner notes of Amor Prohibido.

Vocal credits
Selena – vocals, background vocals, composer
Stephanie Lynn, Rick Alvarez, "Rock 'n' Roll" James – background vocals

Visuals and imagery
Lisette Lorenzo – art direction
Maurice Rinaldi – photography

Instruments

Suzette Quintanilla – drums, producer
Chris Pérez – electric guitar, drum programming, arranger
A.B. Quintanilla – bass guitar, bajo sexto
Henry Gomez – guitar
Joe Ojeda – keyboards, arranger
Ricky Vela – keyboards, programming, arranger, composer

Johnny Saenz – accordion
Rafael Gasca – trumpet
Rene Gasca – trumpet
Gilbert Garza – trombone

Technical and production credits

A.B. – composer, producer, programming, mixing, arranger
Jorge A. Pino – executive producer
Brian "Red" Moore – engineer, mixing
Nir Seroussi – editing
Guillermo J. Page – reissue producer
Bebu Silvetti – arranger, producer

Charts

Weekly charts

Quarterly charts

Year-end charts

Certifications and sales 

!scope="row"|Worldwide
|
|2,500,000 
|-

See also 

 1994 in Latin music
 Selena albums discography
 List of number-one Billboard Top Latin Albums from the 1990s
 Billboard Regional Mexican Albums Year-end Chart, 1990s
 List of number-one Billboard Regional Mexican Albums of 1994
 List of number-one Billboard Regional Mexican Albums of 1995
 List of number-one Billboard Regional Mexican Albums of 1996
 List of best-selling Latin albums
 List of best-selling Latin albums in the United States
 Latin American music in the United States
 Women in Latin music

Notes

References

Works cited 

           

 - Read online, registration required

External links 

1994 albums
Albums produced by A.B. Quintanilla
EMI Latin albums
Spanish-language albums
Selena albums
Tejano Music Award winners for Album of the Year
Albums recorded at Q-Productions